Tambra Raye Stevenson is an African-American entrepreneur, nutrition educator, public speaker, policy advisor, inventor, and food justice activist. Stevenson founded WANDA (Women, Advancing, Dietetics and Nutrition) and NativSol Kitchen. She is a Nutrition and Health Co-chair for the DC Food Policy Council, a Committee member for the National Agricultural Research, Extension, Education, and Economics (NAREEE) Advisory Board, and was named National Geographic Traveler of the Year in 2014.

Early life 
Stevenson was raised in a multi-faith family where the loss of family and community members due to non-contagious disease impacted her view of nutrition, wellness, and healing. She is known for challenging Westernized diets that cause negative outcomes for women and girls of the African diaspora. Through nutritional education, advocacy, government partnerships and cultural awareness, she focuses on building healthy, sustainable communities, foods, self care, and support for improved health outcomes.

Career 
Stevenson graduated from Oklahoma State University in 2002 and began a career in public service at the Minority Business Development Agency, US Department of Commerce; including the first D.C. Mayor's Office on Women's Policy and Initiatives. Then USDA Secretary Tom Vilsack selected Stevenson to serve on the National Agricultural Research, Extension, Education, and Economics (NAREEE) Advisory Board, 2021.

Stevenson is the author of a series of bilingual children's books on nutrition called Where's WANDA? which are illustrated by Nigerian artists.

Education 
Stevenson earned a BS degree in nutritional science and minored in Spanish at Oklahoma State University in 2002. During that same year, she completed a Study Abroad Program in Community Health and Spanish Immersion at Pontificia Universidad Católica Madre y Maestra, Santiago, Dominican Republic as a Boren National Security Scholar. In 2004, she continued her education at Tufts University School of Medicine in Boston, Massachusetts achieving an MPH in health communications. Stevenson, through the University of the District of Columbia, Washington D.C., began a Didactic Program in Dietetics in 2012, and completed a Dietetic Internship in 2014. Currently, she is completing a Ph.D. program at  American University School of Communication in Washington, DC.

Honors and recognition 
Dr. Wm. Montague Cobb Food and Health Advocacy Award, N.A.A.C.P., 2017.
Diversity Hall of Fame/Rising Star Recipient, Oklahoma State University, 2016.
Nutrition Hero, Food and Nutrition Magazine, 2014.
Traveler of the Year, National Geographic, 2014.
Emerging Leader in Dietetics/Cynthia A. Reeser Award, D.C. Academy of Nutrition and Dietetics, 2012.

References 

Year of birth missing (living people)
Living people
Oklahoma State University alumni
Tufts University School of Medicine alumni
American nutritionists
American women chief executives